"Better Than Me" is a song co-written and performed by Terry Dexter. The song appears as the opening track on her eponymous debut album and was issued as the album's second single. It is Dexter's only song to date to chart on the Billboard Hot 100, peaking at #99 in 1999.

Music video

The official music video for the song was directed by Director X.

Chart positions

References

External links
 
 

1998 songs
1999 singles
Music videos directed by Director X
Song recordings produced by Jazze Pha
Songs written by Johntá Austin
Songs written by Terry Dexter
Songs written by Jazze Pha
Terry Dexter songs
Warner Records singles